Hoseynabad-e Beglar Beygi (also Romanized as Ḩoseynābād-e Beglar Beygī and Ḩoseynābād-e Bīglarbeygī) is a village in Dashtabi-ye Gharbi Rural District, Dashtabi District, Buin Zahra County, Qazvin Province, Iran. At the 2006 census, its population was 86, in 23 families.

References 

Populated places in Buin Zahra County